Artsyom Huzik (born 8 April 1992) is a Belarusian professional football player currently playing for Dyatlovo.

References

External links

1992 births
Living people
Belarusian footballers
Association football defenders
Belarusian expatriate footballers
Expatriate footballers in Poland
FC Neman Grodno players
FC Smorgon players
FC Slonim-2017 players